The 4 arrondissements of the Calvados department are:

 Arrondissement of Bayeux, (subprefecture: Bayeux) with 123 communes.  The population of the arrondissement was 73,896 in 2016.  
 Arrondissement of Caen, (prefecture of the Calvados department: Caen) with 201 communes. The population of the arrondissement was 384,540 in 2016.  
 Arrondissement of Lisieux, (subprefecture: Lisieux) with 160 communes. The population of the arrondissement was 162,678 in 2016.  
 Arrondissement of Vire, (subprefecture: Vire-Normandie) with 44 communes.  The population of the arrondissement was 72,565 in 2016.

History

In 1800 the arrondissements of Caen, Bayeux, Falaise, Lisieux, Pont-l'Évêque and Vire were established. The arrondissements of Falaise and Pont-l'Évêque were disbanded in 1926. 

The borders of the arrondissements of Calvados were modified in January 2017:
 four communes from the arrondissement of Bayeux to the arrondissement of Vire 
 19 communes from the arrondissement of Caen to the arrondissement of Bayeux
 15 communes from the arrondissement of Caen to the arrondissement of Lisieux
 20 communes from the arrondissement of Caen to the arrondissement of Vire

References

Calvados